"She" is a song by the American rock band Green Day. It is the eighth track on their third album, Dookie and was released as the fifth and final single. The song was written by frontman Billie Joe Armstrong about a former girlfriend who showed him a feminist poem with an identical title. In return, Armstrong wrote the lyrics of "She" and showed them to her. She later dumped him and moved to Ecuador, prompting Armstrong to put "She" on the album. The same ex-girlfriend is the topic of the songs "Sassafras Roots" and "Chump". It is one of the few Green Day singles that did not have a music video. The song is notorious for a concert where Armstrong performed the song nude.

Track listing

Reception
The song has been frequently listed as one of their best songs. Kerrang! listed it as their second best song, while Rolling Stone listed it as their seventh. PopMatters listed "She" as the eighth best Green Day song, citing ""She" is sensitive without being soft; in between Armstrong's empathetic declarations of "Scream at me / Until my ears bleed / I'm taking heed / Just for you", the band is hammering away at its instruments with amped-up intensity."

Covers
In 2016, British-American band As It Is covered the song for the Green Day cover album  "American Superhits!".

In 2018, Californian punk-ska band Mad Caddies covered the song with a reggae beat for their cover album Punk Rocksteady.

Charts

References

Green Day songs
Songs written by Billie Joe Armstrong
1995 singles
Songs with feminist themes
Song recordings produced by Rob Cavallo
Songs written by Mike Dirnt
Songs written by Tré Cool
1994 songs